Kevin van Diermen (born 3 July 1989) is a Dutch former professional footballer who plays as a centre back.

Club career
He formerly played for Vitesse, who loaned him for six months to Go Ahead Eagles, Excelsior and NAC, where he joined his former coach at Excelsior, Marinus Dijkhuizen.

References

External links
 

1989 births
Living people
People from Spakenburg
Association football central defenders
Dutch footballers
SBV Vitesse players
Go Ahead Eagles players
Excelsior Rotterdam players
NAC Breda players
De Graafschap players
IJsselmeervogels players
Eredivisie players
Eerste Divisie players
Tweede Divisie players
Footballers from Utrecht (province)